In environmental law, the polluter pays principle is enacted to make the party responsible for producing pollution responsible for paying for the damage done to the natural environment. It is regarded as a regional custom because of the strong support it has received in most Organisation for Economic Co-operation and Development (OECD) and European Union countries. It is a fundamental principle in US environmental law.

History 
According to the French historian of the environment Jean-Baptiste Fressoz henu, financial compensation (not named "polluter pays principle" at that time) is already the regulation principle of pollution favoured by industrials in the nineteenth century. He wrote that: "This principle, which is now offered as a new solution, actually accompanied the process of industrialisation, and was intended by the manufacturers themselves."

Applications in environmental law

The polluter pays principle underpins environmental policy such as an ecotax, which, if enacted by government, deters and essentially reduces greenhouse gas emissions. This principle is based on the fact that as much as pollution is unavoidable, the person or industry that is responsible for the pollution must pay some money for the rehabilitation of the polluted environment.

Australia
The state of New South Wales in Australia has included the polluter pay principle with the other principles of ecologically sustainable development in the objectives of the Environment Protection Authority.

European Union
The polluter pays principle is set out in the Treaty on the Functioning of the European Union and Directive 2004/35/EC of the European Parliament and of the Council of 21 April 2004 on environmental liability with regard to the prevention and remedying of environmental damage is based on this principle. The directive entered into force on 30 April 2004; member states were allowed three years to transpose the directive into their domestic law and by July 2010 all member states had completed this.

France 
In France, the Charter for the Environment contains a formulation of the polluter pays principle (article 4):

Ghana
In Ghana, the polluter pays principle was adopted in 2011.

Sweden
The polluter pays principle is also known as extended producer responsibility (EPR). This is a concept that was probably first described by Thomas Lindhqvist for the Swedish government in 1990. EPR seeks to shift the responsibility of dealing with waste from governments (and thus, taxpayers and society at large) to the entities producing it. In effect, it internalised the cost of waste disposal into the cost of the product, theoretically meaning that the producers will improve the waste profile of their products, thus decreasing waste and increasing possibilities for reuse and recycling.

The Organisation for Economic Co-operation and Development defines extended producer responsibility as: a concept where manufacturers and importers of products should bear a significant degree of responsibility for the environmental impacts of their products throughout the product life-cycle, including upstream impacts inherent in the selection of materials for the products, impacts from manufacturers’ production process itself, and downstream impacts from the use and disposal of the products. Producers accept their responsibility when designing their products to minimise life-cycle environmental impacts, and when accepting legal, physical or socio-economic responsibility for environmental impacts that cannot be eliminated by design.

Switzerland 
The waste management in Switzerland is based on the polluter pays principle. Bin bags (for municipal solid waste) are taxed with pay-per-bag fees in three quarters of the communes (and the recycling rate doubled in twenty years).

United Kingdom
Part IIA of the Environmental Protection Act 1990 established the operation of the polluter pays principle. This was further built upon by The Environmental Damage (Prevention and Remediation) Regulations 2009 (for England) and the Environmental Damage (Prevention and Remediation) (Wales) Regulations 2009 (for Wales).

United States
The principle is employed in all of the major US pollution control laws: Clean Air Act, Clean Water Act, Resource Conservation and Recovery Act (solid waste and hazardous waste management), and Superfund (cleanup of abandoned waste sites).

Some eco-taxes underpinned by the polluter pays principle include:
 the Gas Guzzler Tax for motor vehicles
 Corporate Average Fuel Economy (CAFE), a "polluter pays" fine.
 the Superfund law requires polluters to pay for cleanup of hazardous waste sites, when the polluters can be identified.

Limitations of polluter pays principle
The US Environmental Protection Agency (EPA) has observed that the polluter pays principle has typically not been fully implemented in US laws and programs. For example, drinking water and sewage treatment services are subsidized and there are limited mechanisms in place to fully assess polluters for treatment costs.

Zimbabwe
The Zimbabwe Environmental Management Act of 2002  prohibits the discharge of pollutants into the environment. In line with the "Polluter Pays" principle, the Act requires a polluter to meet the cost of decontaminating the polluted environment.

In international environmental law
In international environmental law it is mentioned in the principle 16 of the Rio Declaration on Environment and Development of 1992.

Exception for excusable ignorance
The polluter pays principle (PPP) has been doubted in cases where no one recognized that a type of pollution posed any danger until after the pollution began.  An example occurs in the history of climate change science which shows that considerable carbon dioxide was emitted into the atmosphere by industrialized countries before there was scientific awareness or consensus that it could be dangerous.

See also

References

Further reading
International Law and Naval War: The Effect of Marine Safety and Pollution Conventions during International Armed Conflict, by Dr. Sonja Ann Jozef Boelaert-Suominen (December 2000). 
Doswald-Beck, ICRC Review (1997), No. 316, 35–55; Greenwood, ibid., 65–75.

Environmental economics
Environmental law
Environmental social science concepts
Industrial ecology
Pollution
Waste management concepts
Legal doctrines and principles